Bored to Death is an American comedy series that ran on HBO from September 20, 2009, to November 28, 2011. The show was created by author Jonathan Ames, and stars Jason Schwartzman as a fictional Jonathan Ames—a writer based in Brooklyn, New York City, who moonlights as an unlicensed private detective. The show also stars Ted Danson as George and Zach Galifianakis as Ray, both friends of Jonathan. On December 20, 2011, HBO cancelled Bored to Death after three seasons and twenty-four episodes. Development of a television movie subsequently began in January 2013.

Cast

Main
 Jason Schwartzman as Jonathan Ames, struggling novelist, Edition journalist, and bumbling private investigator
 Zach Galifianakis as Ray Hueston, comic book artist and Jonathan's best friend. The character is loosely based on comic book artist Dean Haspiel, a friend of the real Jonathan Ames. Haspiel also provides Ray's artwork used in the show.
 Ted Danson as George Christopher, libertine editor of fictitious New York magazine Edition, friend and father figure to Jonathan
 Heather Burns as Leah, Ray's on-and-off girlfriend

Recurring
 Olivia Thirlby as Suzanne, Jonathan's ex-girlfriend (season 1)
 Oliver Platt as Richard Antrem, fictional editor of GQ and rival of George Christopher
 Laila Robins as Priscilla, George's ex-wife and Richard's current wife (seasons 1–2)
 John Hodgman as Louis Green, a pompous author and rival of Jonathan
 Jenny Slate as Stella, an organic food co-op member and pot smoker who becomes Jonathan's lover (seasons 1–2)
 Michael Chernus as Francis Hamm (season 1)
 Zoe Kazan as Nina, Jonathan's student who later becomes his girlfriend (season 2)
 Bebe Neuwirth as Caroline, Jonathan's literary editor
 Patton Oswalt as Howard Baker, the owner of a spy shop that Jonathan, Ray, and George occasionally visit for gear
 Kristen Wiig as Jennifer "Trouble" Gladwell, a barfly and one of Jonathan's first clients (seasons 1–2)
 Jonathan Ames as Irwin, a Jewish man who Ray finds sleeping with Leah (season 2)
 Richard Masur as Ira Ames, Jonathan's father (seasons 2–3)
 Allyce Beasley as Florence Ames, Jonathan's mother (seasons 2–3)
 Mary Kay Place as Kathryn Joiner, a frank employee of a company that is helping Edition tighten its financial belt (season 2)
 Halley Feiffer as Emily, George's daughter who disturbs him with her engagement to an older man (season 3)
 Olympia Dukakis as Belinda, an older woman with whom Ray cheats on Leah (seasons 2–3)
 Mary Steenburgen as Josephine, George's singing teacher and girlfriend (season 3)
 Isla Fisher as Rose, Jonathan's girlfriend. She is later revealed to be his half-sister, conceived in a fertility clinic that subsequently burned down as part of an insurance scam (season 3)
 Stacy Keach as Harrison Bergeron, Jonathan's biological father, operator of the fertility clinic, insurance scammer and con man (season 3)

Episodes

Series overview

Season 1 (2009)

Season 2 (2010)

Season 3 (2011)

Production
Although loosely based in the Park Slope neighborhood of Brooklyn, the series is shot primarily on location in nearby Fort Greene, Brooklyn.

Reception
The first season received favorable reviews, and holds a Metacritic score of 64/100, based on 27 reviews. In a Time blog, James Poniewozik praised the "interplay between the low- and high-life of New York" and the casting choices, calling Danson's portrayal of George a "scene-stealing role". Nancy Franklin of The New Yorker determined that "excellent casting and good writing" supported the series. However, in a blog for Chicago Tribune, Maureen Ryan called the story "tedious," although she praised Danson and Galifianakis' performances. Variety's Brian Lowry called the series "too precious and quirky for its own good," instead wishing the series revolved around Danson's character.

Reviews of the second season were favorable. Jennifer Armstrong of Entertainment Weekly said "the charm is in the details" and added that the "genius of Ted Danson and Zach Galifianakis" strengthened the program. TIME's Poniewozik wrote positively of the second season.

Following Curb Your Enthusiasm, Bored to Death had an audience retention rating of 92 percent of the total 1.1 million person audience according to Nielsen ratings.

Bored to Death won the 2010 Primetime Emmy Award for Main Title Design, against other nominees including The Pacific and Nurse Jackie.

On December 20, 2011, the day Bored to Death was canceled, petitions on several websites including Facebook started circulating.   Jonathan Ames responded to this by stating "It's very sweet. I don't want to discourage it, but I'm embarrassed."

Distribution
HBO Home Entertainment and Warner Home Video released the complete first season on September 21, 2010, the complete second season on October 4, 2011, and the third season on September 4, 2012.

Potential movie
After much speculation, it was announced in early 2013 that HBO would revive Bored to Death in the form of a feature-length network film. In March 2014, Jonathan Ames announced he was nearly done writing the script. In an interview in August 2015, Ames said he had done two iterations of the script, neither of which was quite right, and planned a third. In an interview in April 2018 however, Ames said that a movie is unlikely to be made, though he was considering rebooting the series as a book.

References

External links
 
 

2009 American television series debuts
2011 American television series endings
2000s American comedy-drama television series
2010s American comedy-drama television series
2000s American crime drama television series
2010s American crime drama television series
2000s American mystery television series
2010s American mystery television series
Fictional amateur detectives
HBO original programming
Television shows set in New York City
Neo-noir television series
English-language television shows
Television series created by Jonathan Ames
Television series by 3 Arts Entertainment
Television series by Home Box Office
Television shows about writers